Nayantara or Nayanthara is an Indian girl's name.

Nayantara or Nayanthara (1984) Malayalam film actress
Nayantara Sahgal (1927) Indian writer
Nayantara (plant), Vinca rosea